Eppstein is a town in the Main-Taunus-Kreis, in Hesse, Germany. Eppstein lies west of Frankfurt am Main, around 12 km north east of the state capital Wiesbaden, and is at the edge of the Taunus mountains. The ruins of the Eppstein castle is a prominent landmark, and houses a museum.

Geography

Neighbouring municipalities and areas
To the north, Eppstein borders the city of Idstein (Rheingau-Taunus-Kreis) and the municipality of Glashütten (Hochtaunuskreis). To the east is the city of Kelkheim, to the south the city of Hofheim, and to the west the city of Wiesbaden and the municipality of Niedernhausen.

City arrangement
Eppstein consists of five areas: Bremthal, Ehlhalten, Eppstein, Niederjosbach and Vockenhausen.

Bremthal

Bremthal has a rapid-transit railway stop on line S2. With approximately 5000 inhabitants, Bremthal is the most populous quarter of Eppstein, and is the economic and cultural centre. Bremthal has several associations e.g. a brass band, Germania singing association, Liederkranz singing association, an association of small animal breeders and a volunteer fire brigade.

Bremthal was founded by the Lords of Eppstein in the 10th/11th century because the narrow valley around their castle did not allow for arable land. Bremthal's church, St. Margareta, was built in 1889. The church has a baptismal font (1749) from an earlier church on the site.

A small skate park and forest adventure path off the Wildsachsenerstraße are fun for children.

Niederjosbach
Niederjosbach has a rapid-transit railway stop on line S2 as well as a bus connection to the Wiesbadener transportation network.

Motorway connections are about 3 minutes away. In Niederjosbach is a large campsite, the very well-maintained terrace-like "Taunuscamp", which is on the Sonnenhang. It is open all year round. The GCC - Gusbacher Carnevalsclub - organizes several meetings annually, and on "carnival Tuesday", a noteworthy parade by the village's local associations; two sport clubs, two singing clubs, a fruit and horticulture club, church choir, fire-brigade, "Gusbacher chaoten" (carnival parade organisers), federation of housewives, German Red Cross local association and neighbourhood municipalities. There is an industrial area and several craft enterprises, as well as an urban kindergarten with three groups. The Catholic community centre "Am Honigbaum" ("at the honey tree") is used for church and also for private and other social meetings. The place has been part of Eppstein since 1972. The Niederjosbach coat of arms has a silver fir tree on a red background.

Vockenhausen
Vockenhausen is the seat of the mayor. It has around 4500 people. The administration is distributed between the two city halls in Vockenhausen and Eppstein. On the Vockenhäuser "Gemarkung" are the Freiherr-vom-Stein-Schule (comprehensive school) and the Burg-Schule (primary school).

This "Stadtteil" of Eppstein was founded around 1100 by the Lords of Eppstein and belonged to them until they died out in 1535. Historically, the area was a site for manufacturing. A number of mills (e.g. for grinding grain, dye-making, leather-tanning, and iron extraction) made use of the stream that runs through the town.

The sculpture before the Vockenhausen turn-off between Alt-Eppstein and Bremthal is a reminder of Vockenhausen's "Schmelzmühle" (smelting mill) as well as Vockenhausen's two well-known artists Robert and Ella Bergmann-Michel, who lived at the mill from the 1920s until their deaths.

The sunny hillside of Vockenhausen is home to many families and Eppstein's elementary and middle schools; the valley has a number of traditional German, as well as Greek, Italian, and Chinese restaurants, a few bakeries, guest houses, hair salons, doctors' offices, a tanning and waxing salon, drugstores, dry cleaners/post office, and local grocery stores.

The "Bergstraße" — also called the "Schmerzberg" ("Pain Mountain") during an annual 1 May bike race — goes over the hill to Alt-Eppstein.

Ehlhalten

Ehlhalten is the part with the fewest inhabitants (about 1350) but the largest area due to its rather big forests. According to legend, Ehlhalten once provided a cutter that tailors used at the water of the brook in Ehlhalten. As the water rose and fell, affecting the measurement of the inch, people cried: "Elle halten!" ("hold the inch!"), leading to the name Ehlhalten.

Ehlhalten was also the name of a settlement in the municipal forest near a source. It was burned down however by soldiers and destroyed completely. In 2004 Ehlhalten competed in the final of the series "Dolles Dorf" on hr television, winning a third prize in this show about villages in Hesse.

Mayors
 Ralf Wolter, (2000-2009)
 Peter Reus (independent), 2009-2013 
 Alexander Simon, since 2013

Economy

Transport
Eppstein station is on the Main-Lahn Railway and is served by line S 2 of the Rhine-Main S-Bahn, running between Niedernhausen and Dietzenbach via Frankfurt and the town is around 3 km from the A3 Autobahn. Bundesstraße 455 passes through the town.

Local industry
The Stanniolfabrik Eppstein is in the central part Eppstein, beneath the castle. They are manufacturing tin foil and similar metal foils for highly specialised applications. It has become famous due to an appearance in the television series MythBusters, because they supplied lead foil for the lead ballon myth.

RUCO printing inks (A. M. Ramp & Co GmbH) also has a facility here.

Education
for the educational system in Germany, see Education in Germany

Eppstein has two primary schools and one comprehensive school. In addition, the Hessen-Thüringen bank academy is located here. The Eppstein-Rossert music school and the Eppstein music society offer instruction in various musical instruments.

Primary schools
In Eppstein Vockenhausen, near the training and sports centre at the Bienroth, is the "Burg-Schule" (castle school). It is somewhat larger with approx. 300 pupils than the "Commenius-Schule," which is the primary school for pupils from Eppstein's parts Bremthal and Niederjosbach.

Freiherr-vom-Stein-Gesamtschule
Eppstein's comprehensive school, the Freiherr-vom-Stein-Gesamtschule, is located at the sports and school centre "Am Bienroth". Five-hundred and sixty students in the fifth to tenth years attend the school, which is divided into three sections: Hauptschule (year 5 to 9),  Realschule and Gymnasium (both year 5 to 10).
A special feature of the school is the annual exchange of students with Eppstein's twinned town of Kenilworth, England, as well as a school in Tours, France. Every two years the school also hosts an exchange with the Bornova Anadolu Lisesi in İzmir, Turkey.

The school is known for a tragic attack: on 3 June 1983 a man shot three children, one teacher and a police officer dead. The attacker then committed suicide. 14 were injured.

Town partnerships
Eppstein is twinned with four towns:
 Aizkraukle, Latvia since 1998
 Kenilworth, England since 1994
 Langeais, France since 1986
 Schwarza, Thuringia, Germany

Buildings

The ruins of the Eppstein castle (first mention in 1122--"Ebbensten") give character to the old city centre of Eppstein.

The museum in Eppstein's castle is in the one building within the castle walls which was spared breakup in the early 19th century. The museum contains baroque altar in the back, which Eppstein's Catholics acquired when they used the building as their chapel after the valley church (Talkirche) became Protestant during the Reformation. Upstairs are some books written by early travel writers who refer to Eppstein, including a copy of Dumas's Le chateau d'Eppstein, as well as paintings of the castle, some painted by members of one of the first painters' colonies in Germany—the "Kronberger Malerkolonie."
At the foot of the castle, in the middle of the historical old city, is the Talkirche (Valley Church), which today accommodates Eppstein's evangelical parish.

Eppstein's turn-of-the-century train station (1903) has been newly renovated and houses not only an RMV counter (Rhine-Main bus and commuter train information counter), the Bürgerbüro (citizens' information center), but also a restaurant/cafe.

The Villa Anna, above the train station, was built  in the 1880s by the wealthy Frankfurt businessman Alfred von Neufville. Its grounds were designed by the famous landscaper Andreas Weber (who also designed the Frankfurt Zoo). With 200 exotic trees and bushes, its park is one of only two "Bergparks" (mountainside parks) in all of Hesse.

The Neufville Tower was built by the Neufvilles to house their private art collection and to serve as their "Jagdhaus" (hunting lodge).

Eppstein's beautification society keeps up a number of scenic overlooks, most of them built over a century ago during the flowering of Eppstein as a "Luftkurort" (climatic spa town).

The "Pionier-Tempel," an iron structure, earlier nicknamed the "omnibus" or "tram temple," is a five-minute walk from the train station. It was built in 1889 by the 2nd company of the "pionier" (engineer) battalion XI from Mainz-Kastel. In four days, 500 men cut the forest path between the Eppstein train station and Wildsachsen for the transport of timber. When they finished, in keeping with the late 18th-century English tradition of landscape gardens dotted by gazebos and observation points, they built the scenic overlook.

The Kaisertempel with its Doric columns was built in 1894 as a memorial to commemorate the Prussian victory in the Franco-Prussian War (1870/71), which unified the German Empire under King Wilhelm I of Prussia. From the temple, there is a wonderful view of Eppstein as far as Bremthal.

Meetings
The annual bicycle race Rund um den Henninger-Turm (around the Henninger tower) runs through Eppstein, on the first of May each year.

Since 2003 the Taunus Trails mountain bike marathon, open to everyone, takes place each summer.

Regular events at the castle include the Burgfestspiele (castle festival) in summer. In the inner court of the castle, drama groups present classic works as well as new productions. Another notable highlight is the Saxdays.

Notable people from Eppstein

 Johann Adam Freiherr von Ickstatt, (1702–1776), director of the University of Ingolstadt, 
 Theodor Fliedner (1800–1864), pastor and innovator of the apostolic deacon's office.
 Alfred Bickel (1918–1999), Swiss football player and coach.
Andreas Paulus (born 1968), international lawyer and judge of the Bundesverfassungsgericht.
 Felix Mendelssohn Bartholdy (1809–1847), musician
 Robert Michel (1897–1983), typographer, graphic artist and testpilot
 Ella Bergmann-Michel (1895–1971), painter, photographer and documentary filmmaker

References

External links
 Official site
 
 

Towns in Hesse
Main-Taunus-Kreis
Historic Jewish communities